Puerto Rican Power Orchestra is a Puerto Rican salsa band which under this name supported Tito Rojas.

Puerto Rican Power was associated with singer Justo Betancourt, bassist Jesús Castro, trumpet player Luisito Ayala, singer Tito Rojas.

Discography
 Tres Mujeres with Tito Rojas (1987)
 Solo Con Un Beso with Tito Rojas (1988)
Canta Tito Rojas - hits "Quiéreme tal como soy", "Amor de mentira", "Noche de boda" and "Piel con piel",
Con Más Poder
Con Todo El Poder 1992, featuring the hit single "A Donde Iras"
Men in Salsa, 1999.
Wild Wild Salsa 2001 
Salsa Another Day 2003
Exitos y Mas [DualDisc] 2006
Salsa of the Caribbean 2007
Orquesta Puerto Rican Power 2008
Tranquilo y Tropical 2015
Dos X Uno 2017

References

Puerto Rican musical groups
Salsa music groups